Zoltán Benkő (born 13 June 1983 in Budapest), is a Hungarian sprint canoer who has competed since the mid-2000s. Competing in two Summer Olympics, he earned his best finish of ninth twice (K-1 1000 m: 2008, K-2 1000 m: 2004).

References
Sports-Reference.com profile

1983 births
Canoeists at the 2004 Summer Olympics
Canoeists at the 2008 Summer Olympics
Hungarian male canoeists
Living people
Olympic canoeists of Hungary
Canoeists from Budapest
21st-century Hungarian people